Eriococcidae is a family of scale insects in the order Hemiptera. They are commonly known as felt scales or eriococcids. Each species is usually specific to a different plant host, or closely related group of hosts.

Recent research using ribosomal DNA has shown that the family Eriococcidae is not a single monophyletic group but is an aggregation of several different groups. Some species that appear morphologically similar seem to be only distantly related while dissimilar species are sometimes more closely related. The type genus Eriococcus has been shown to be polyphyletic.

Morphology
Felt scales are a diverse group of scale insects. They produce a white, yellowish or gray membranous capsule or ovisac that encloses the pyramid-shaped body of the adult female. The body itself varies in colour and may be pink, red or purple, green or brown. The posterior end of the sac has a small opening that allows newly hatched nymphs to emerge. Some species occur under the bark of the host plant and produce little or no ovisac secretion. The bodies of these are often pink or red. Many species produce galls, including Apiomorpha which feeds on various species of eucalypt and have a complex life cycle. It can produce separate male galls that are induced on existing female galls.

Some species are tree pests in North America, including: European elm scale, azalea bark scale, oak eriococcin, crape myrtle bark scale, beech scale

Genera

 Acalyptococcus
 Acanthococcus
 Aculeococcus
 Affeldococcus
 Alpinococcus
 Apezococcus
 Apiococcus
 Apiomorpha
 Ascelis
 Atriplicia
 Balticococcus
 Borchseniococcus
 Bryococcus
 Callococcus
 Calycicoccus
 Capulinia
 Carpochloroides
 Chazeauana
 Chilechiton
 Chilecoccus
 Cornoculus
 Cryptococcus
 Cylindrococcus
 Cystococcus
 Eremococcus
 Eriochiton
 Eriococcus
 Erium
 Exallococcus
 Gedanicoccus
 Gossypariella
 Greenoripersia
 Hoheriococcus
 Hoyicoccus
 Icelococcus
 Intecticoccus
 Jutlandicoccus
 Kotejacoccus
 Kuenowicoccus
 Kuwanina
 Lachnodius
 Macroporicoccus
 Macracanthopyga
 Madarococcus
 Megacoccus
 Melzeria
 Montanococcus
 Neoacanthococcus
 Neoeriochiton
 Neotectococcus
 Noteococcus
 Olliffia
 Opisthoscelis
 Orafortis
 Oregmopyga
 Ourococcus
 Ovaticoccus
 Pedroniopsis
 Phacelococcus
 Phloeococcus
 Proteriococcus
 Pseudocapulinia
 Pseudomontanococcus
 Pseudotectococcus
 Ripersia
 Sangicoccus
 Scutare
 Sisyrococcus
 Sphaerococcopsis
 Stegococcus
 Stibococcus
 Subcorticoccus
 Tanyscelis
 Tectococcus
 Tolypecoccus
 Xerococcus

See also
 Cryptococcus fagisuga

References

  1963: A catalogue of the Eriococcidae (Homoptera: Coccoidea) of the world. New Zealand Department of Scientific and Industrial Research bulletin, 150: 1-260. http://hdl.handle.net/2027/coo.31924002840985
 ;  2005: ScaleNet 

 
Scale insects
Hemiptera families
Neococcoids